Tom Calwell (2 February 1925 – 4 July 2004) was an  Australian rules footballer who played with Hawthorn in the Victorian Football League (VFL).

Notes

External links 

1925 births
2004 deaths
Australian rules footballers from Victoria (Australia)
Hawthorn Football Club players